Paul van Herck (19 May 1938 in Berchem – 19 June 1989) was a Belgian writer of science fiction novels and radio plays.

Van Herck was a Dutch and French language teacher. He debuted with radio plays for the BRT but became most well known for making plays for the Dutch TROS of which his series about space reporter and NASA astronaut Matt Meldon was the most famous.

Apart from his radio plays he wrote many science fiction novels of which Sam, of de Pluterdag (translated in English as Where were you last Pluterday?) was the most notable. The novel won the first prize at the first European Science Fiction Convention in the Italian city Trieste.

Bibliography

Novels
1965 - De circels en andere fantastische verhalen
De circels
Depannage
Dorpsgek
Feestmaal
Hallo
De kinderrevolutie
M. Lawson
Mijn vriend DX 5
Paranoia
Polsuurwerk
Regen
Theorie
1968 - Sam, of de Pluterdag (M=SF 14)
1973 - Apollo XXI
1976 - Caroline O Caroline

Stories
1965 - Het project Bonaparte
1967 - Hula's koteletten
1967 - Vuilnis
1968 - De spiegel
1968 - Sam en de uitgever
1968 - Schaapjes
1968 - Twee voor twaalf
1969 - De wind
1969 - Finish
1970 - Iets over vuiligheid
1970 - Kwota rood vier
1971 - Het Leland experiment
1971 - Instantvisie
1971 - Primeur
1972 - Cijfer, cijfer, cijfer, cijfer
1973 - Carol
1973 - De laatste
1973 - Mont Noir
1974 - Katalysator
1974 - Twark
1975 - 20 miljard dollar... naar de maan
1975 - Dreyfus
1975 - Het mannetje
1975 - Notker van Luik
1975 - Parallel
1977 - Tequila
1978 - Een wilde rukwind
1978 - Ouwe
1978 - Tweede leven
1979 - Amerika
1979 - Sol 3
1984 - Phil, of het VIde continent
1986 - De spin met de tien poten
1987 - De tijdmachine
1988 - Lampen

Radio plays
Matt Meldon-cycle
1970 - Apollo XXI - Het maanmysterie
1970 - De gesluierde planeet
1971 - Tunnel der duisternis
1973 - Prometheus XIII
1976 - De blauwe zaden
1980 - Het zesde continent
1970 - Het fatale uur van Mister Lawson
1974 - De tijdmachine
19?? - De gemeenschappelijke factor
1969 - Een kwestie van vingerafdrukken

Comic books (scenario)
Historical stories
1974 - Het vaandel met het rode kruis
1976 - Spartacus
1984 - De slag bij Verdun
1985 - Het pistool van Syd
1985 - Het laatste oorlogspad
1986 - De doden van Borgerhout
1986 - Pasteur : kwakzalver of geleerde ?

External links

 Paul van Herck's radio plays, Geronimo Hoorspelen
 Paul van Herck in the Encyclopedia Fantastica (archived on archive.org)

1938 births
1989 deaths
Belgian science fiction writers
People from Berchem